This is a list of villages and settlements in Bayelsa State, Nigeria, organised by local government area (LGA) and district or area. Postal codes also given.

By postal code
Below is a list of polling units, that includes villages and schools, arranged properly by postal code

By electoral ward
Below is a list of polling units, including villages and schools, organised by electoral ward.

References

Bayelsa